The  New York Giants season was the franchise's 64th season in the National Football League (NFL). The team would finish with 10 wins and 6 losses, but a loss to the New York Jets in the season finale would keep them out of the playoffs for the second consecutive season. The Giants would finish second behind the Philadelphia Eagles in the division, losing the conference tiebreaker to the Los Angeles Rams for the final wild card. The season was marked early by the suspension for substance abuse of star linebacker Lawrence Taylor by the NFL for the first four games of the season. Following the end of the season, the Giants would see two longtime defensive stalwarts; defensive end George Martin and future Hall-of-Fame inside linebacker Harry Carson, announce their retirement.

Offseason

NFL draft

Personnel

Staff

Roster

Regular season

Schedule

Game summaries

Week 1

Week 3

Week 9

Week 13

Standings

References

External links 
 1988 New York Giants at Pro-Football-Reference.com

New York Giants seasons
New York Giants
New York Giants season
20th century in East Rutherford, New Jersey
Meadowlands Sports Complex